The inaugural Winter Olympics were held in Chamonix, France, from 25 January to 4 February 1924. A total of 258 athletes from 16 National Olympic Committees (NOCs) competed in 16 events across 9 disciplines. Women also took part in these Games, although the only events they were allowed to compete in were the figure skating ladies' singles and pairs. When the Games were held, they were not recognized as the Winter Olympics but rather as a winter sports week festival. It was not until 1926 that the International Olympic Committee (IOC) officially recognized them as the first Winter Olympics.

A total of 104 athletes won medals for their NOCs, but the athletes from Norway and Finland stood out and dominated the Games, winning 17 and 11 medals, respectively. The United States and Great Britain tied for third place in the count of total medals, with four each. Athletes from 10 of the 16 participating NOCs won at least one medal; eight won at least one gold medal. Many of the athletes who won these medals had already returned to their home countries by the time the medals were awarded, on 5 February, and other participants from their countries had to take the medals to the winning athletes.

Finnish speed skater Clas Thunberg topped the medal count with five medals: three golds, one silver, and one bronze. One of his competitors, Roald Larsen of Norway, also won five medals, with two silver and three bronze medal-winning performances. The first gold medalist at these Games—and therefore the first gold medalist in Winter Olympic history—was American speed skater Charles Jewtraw. Only one medal change took place after the Games: in the ski jump competition, a marking error deprived American athlete Anders Haugen of a bronze medal. Haugen pursued an appeal to the IOC many years after the fact; he was awarded the medal after a 1974 decision in his favor.

{| id="toc" class="toc" summary="Contents"
|align="center" colspan=3|Contents
|-
|
Bobsleigh
Cross-country skiing
Curling
|valign=top|
Figure skating
Ice hockey
Military patrol
|valign=top|
Nordic combined
Ski jumping
Speed skating
|-
|align=center colspan=3|Medal leaders   See also   Notes   References   External links
|}


Bobsleigh

Cross-country skiing

Curling

Figure skating

Ice hockey

Military patrol

Nordic combined

Ski jumping

Speed skating

Medal leaders

Athletes who won multiple medals are listed below.

Notes

See also
1924 Winter Olympics medal table

References

External links

1924 Winter

medal winners